Undibacterium pigrum is a Gram-negative, rod-shaped, oxidase positive, non-spore-forming, and nonmotile bacterium of the genus Undibacterium, which was found in drinking water.

References

External links
Type strain of Undibacterium pigrum at BacDive -  the Bacterial Diversity Metadatabase

Burkholderiales
Bacteria described in 2011